Lele River may refer to:

 Lélé River, a river in Cameroon
 Another name of Lakulaku River, a river in Taiwan